South Korea competed as Korea at the 1992 Summer Olympics in Barcelona, Spain. 226 competitors, 154 men and 72 women, took part in 134 events in 24 sports.

Medalists

Competitors
The following is the list of number of competitors in the Games.

Archery

Korea's fourth appearance in Olympic archery earned them another pair of gold medals and a pair of silver medals. The women continued to dominate the field, though not quite as thoroughly as they had on their home field four years earlier. The individuals went a combined 16-5, while the teams were 5-1.

Women's Individual Competition:
 Cho Youn-jeong — Final (→  Gold Medal), 5-0
 Kim Soo-nyung — Final (→  Silver Medal), 4-1
 Lee Eun-kyung — Round of 16 (→ 14th place), 1-1

Men's Individual Competition:
 Chung Jae-hun — Final (→  Silver Medal (4-1)
 Han Seung-hoon — Round of 16 (→ 15th place), 1-1
 Lim Hee-sik — Round of 32 (→ 20th place), 1-1

Women's Team Competition:
 Cho, Kim, and Lee — Final (→  Gold Medal), 4-0

Men's Team Competition:
 Chung, Han, and Lim — Quarterfinal (→ 5th place), 1-1

Athletics

Men's Marathon
 Hwang Young-cho 2:13.23 (→  Gold Medal)
 Kim Jae-ryong 2:15.01 (→ 10th place)
 Kim Wan-ki — 2:18.32 (→ 28th place)

Men's Javelin Throw
 Kim Ki-hoon
 Qualification — 72.68 m (→ did not advance)

Women's Marathon
 Lee Mi-ok — 2:54.21 (→ 25th place)

Badminton

Boxing

Men's Light Flyweight (– 48 kg)
 Cho Dong-bum
 First Round – Defeated Luigi Castiglione (ITA), 8:2
 Second Round – Lost to Pál Lakatos (HUN), 15:20

Canoeing

Cycling

Four male cyclists represented South Korea in 1992.

Men's team pursuit
 Ji Seung-hwan
 Kim Yong-gyu
 Park Min-su
 Won Chang-yong

Men's points race
 Park Min-su

Equestrianism

Fencing

15 fencers, 10 men and 5 women represented South Korea in 1992.

Men's foil
 Yu Bong-hyeong
 Kim Yeong-ho
 Kim Seung-pyo

Men's team foil
 Kim Yeong-ho, Kim Seung-pyo, Lee Ho-seong, Lee Seung-yong, Yu Bong-hyeong

 Men's épée
 Lee Sang-gi
 Jang Tae-seok
 Kim Jeong-gwan

Men's team épée
 Lee Sang-gi, Jang Tae-seok, Kim Jeong-gwan, Gu Gyo-dong, Lee Sang-yeop

Women's foil
 Lee Jeong-sook
 Shin Seong-ja
 Kim Jin-sun

Women's team foil
 Lee Jeong-sook, Shin Seong-ja, Kim Jin-sun, Jang Mi-gyeong, Jeon Mi-gyeong

Football

Korea was represented by the following squad in Barcelona: (1) Kim Bong-soo, (2) Na Seung-hwa, (3) Lee Moon-seok, (4) Han Jung-kook, (5) Kang Chul, (6) Shin Tae-yong, (7) Kim Gwi-hwa, (8) Noh Jung-yoon, (9) Gwak Kyung-keun, (10) Chung Jae-kwon, (11) Seo Jung-won, (12) Cho Jung-hyun, (13) Kim Do-keun, (14) Jung Kwang-seok, (15) Lee Seung-hyup, (16) Cho Jin-ho, (17) Lee Lim-saeng, (18) Lee Jin-hang, (19) Shin Bum-chul, and (20) Lee Woon-jae. Coach: Kim Sam-rak.

Gymnastics

Handball

Men's team competition
 Preliminary round (group A)
 South Korea – Hungary 22-18
 South Korea – Sweden 18-26
 South Korea – Czechoslovakia 20-19
 South Korea – Iceland 24-26
 South Korea – Brazil 30-26

 Classification Match
 5th/6th place: South Korea – Spain 21-36 (→ Sixth place)

 Team roster
 Back Sang-suh
 Cho Burn-yun
 Cho Chi-hyo
 Cho Young-shin
 Choi Suk-jae
 Jung Kang-wook
 Kang Jae-won
 Lee Ki-ho
 Lee Kyu-chang
 Lee Min-woo
 Lee Sun-soon
 Lim Jin-suk
 Moon Byung-wook
 Park Do-hun
 Shim Jae-hong
 Yoon Kyung-shin
 Head coach: Lee Kvu-jung

Women's Team Competition
 Preliminary round (group B)
 South Korea – Norway 27-16
 South Korea – Austria 27-27
 South Korea – Spain 28-18
Semi Finals
 South Korea – Germany 26-25
Gold Medal Match
 South Korea – Norway 28-21 (→  Gold Medal)

 Team roster
 Nam Eun-young
 Lee Ho-youn
 Kim Hwa-sook
 Moon Hyang-ja
 Min Hye-sook
 Cha Jae-kyung
 Hong Jeong-ho
 Park Jeong-lim
 Park Kap-sook
 Lee Mi-young
 Lim O-kyeong
 Jang Ri-ra
 Oh Sung-ok
 Head coach: Chung Hyung-kyun

Hockey

Judo

Modern pentathlon

Three male pentathletes represented South Korea in 1992.

Individual
 Lee Yeong-chan
 Kim Myeong-geon
 Kim In-ho

Team
 Lee Yeong-chan
 Kim Myeong-geon
 Kim In-ho

Rhythmic gymnastics

Rowing

Sailing

Shooting

Twelve South Korean shooters (seven men and five women) qualified to compete in the following events:
Men

Women

Open

Swimming

Table tennis

Tennis

Volleyball

Weightlifting

Wrestling

References

Korea, South
1992
Olympics, Summer